Macroctenus is a genus of wandering spiders first described by A. Henrard & Rudy Jocqué in 2017.

Species
 it contains five species:
Macroctenus herbicola Henrard & Jocqué, 2017 — Guinea
Macroctenus kingsleyi (F. O. Pickard-Cambridge, 1898) — West, Central Africa
Macroctenus nimba Henrard & Jocqué, 2017 — Guinea
Macroctenus occidentalis (F. O. Pickard-Cambridge, 1898) — West Africa
Macroctenus vandenspiegeli Henrard & Jocqué, 2017 — Guinea

References

External links

Araneomorphae genera
Ctenidae